Cladium californicum is a species of flowering plant in the sedge family known as California sawgrass. It is native to the southwestern United States and northern Mexico where it grows in moist areas in a number of habitat types, often in alkaline soils. It grows from rhizomes in dense clumps. The narrow leaves are flat and edged with small, sharp teeth. The inflorescence is a large panicle of spikelets yielding oval-shaped, purplish-brown fruits.

External links
Jepson Manual Treatment
Photo gallery

californicum
Plants described in 1880